Wharton School Publishing was a publishing house, a division of The Wharton School and Pearson, the world's largest education publishing and technology company. The imprint brought together a variety of business educators and corporate executives on a list that featured works in many formats, including print, audio, electronic documents, CD-ROM and video. The imprint released 35 to 40 peer-reviewed books a year in 11 languages: Arabic, Chinese, English, French, German, Italian, Japanese, Korean, Portuguese, Russian, and Spanish. Authors published by Wharton School Publishing included  Howard Moskowitz, Philip Kotler, Peter Drucker, C.K. Prahalad, Russell L. Ackoff, Jerry I. Porras, Henry Mintzberg and Kenichi Ohmae.

The Wharton School's publishing partnership with Pearson ended in 2010. In 2011, The Wharton School launched its own book publishing arm, Wharton Digital Press, which was renamed Wharton School Press in 2019.

See also

 List of English-language book publishing companies
 List of university presses

References

 http://whartonmagazine.com/issues/winter-2011/the-digital-revolution/#sthash.hY0G245k.dpbs
 https://wsp.wharton.upenn.edu/blog_post/new-name-wharton-school-press/

External links 
Wharton School website

Academic publishing companies
Publishing companies of the United States
University of Pennsylvania
Pearson plc
Publishing companies established in 2004
Book publishing companies based in Pennsylvania
2004 establishments in Pennsylvania